CF Granma is a Cuban football team playing in the Cuban National Football League and representing Granma Province. They play their home games at the Estadio Mártires de Barbados in Bayamo or at the Conrado Benítez in Jiguaní.

History
Nicknamed Los Incansables, the team never won the national league title, but was runner-up in 2002.

Current squad
2018 Season

Historical list of coaches
  Walter Benítez (2009–2010)
  Manuel Castillo (2011-2012)
  Walter Benítez (2012)
  Ramón Marrero (2013-

References

Granma
Bayamo